This is a list of radio broadcast networks.

By country

Australia
Public Networks
Australian Broadcasting Corporation
ABC Local Radio
ABC Radio National
ABC Classic
Triple J
ABC NewsRadio
Special Broadcasting Service
SBS Radio
SBS Arabic24
SBS PopAsia
SBS PopDesi
Commercial Networks
 Ace Radio
 ARN
 ARN Regional
 KIIS Network
 Pure Gold Network
 Capital Radio Network
 Forever Classic
 Capital Hit Network
 Nine Radio
 News Talk
 Classic Hits
 Nova Entertainment
 Nova
 Smooth
 Southern Cross Austereo
 Hit
 Triple M
 Rebel Media
 Rebel FM
 The Breeze
 Resonate Broadcasting
 Sports Entertainment Network
 Sports Entertainment Network
 Classic Hits
 Super Radio Network

Brazil
Brazil Communication Company
Rádio Nacional
Radio Mechanic
Jovem Pan News
Jovem Pan FM
CBN
Radio Bandeirantes
BandNews FM
Mix FM
Massa FM
Band FM
Native FM

Canada
Canadian Broadcasting Corporation
CBC Radio One
CBC Radio 2
CBC Radio 3
Première Chaîne
Espace musique
Bande à part
MBC Radio
Corus Radio Network
Énergie
Rouge FM
Rythme FM
Sportsnet Radio
TSN Radio

Defunct

CNR Radio Network (1923-1933)
Canadian Radio Broadcasting Commission (1932-1936)
Broadcasting Corporation of Newfoundland (1939-1949)
Dominion Network (1944-1962)
Trans-Canada Network (1944-1962)
CKO (1977-1989)
Pelmorex Radio Network (1990-1999)
The Team (2001-2002)
Aboriginal Voices Radio Network (2002-2016)

China
China National Radio
China Radio International
Shanghai Media Group

India
BBC Hindi
All India Radio (AIR)
Vividh Bharati
Radio City (91.1)
Big FM (92.7)
Radio One (94.3)
Radio Mirchi (98.3)
Red FM (93.5)
Suryan FM (93.5)
Hello FM (106.4)

Indonesia

 Radio Republik Indonesia (RRI)
 Prambors
 Delta FM
 I-Radio
 Trax FM
 Gen FM
 Elshinta Radio
 MNC Trijaya
 RDI
 Global Radio
 Oz Radio
 Sonora FM
 Hard Rock FM

Ireland
RTÉ Radio 1
RTÉ 2fm
RTÉ lyric fm
RTÉ Raidió na Gaeltachta
Today FM

Japan
NHK Radio 1
JRN
NRN
JFN
JFL
MegaNet

South Korea
Korean Broadcasting System
Munhwa Broadcasting Corporation
Seoul Broadcasting System

New Zealand
Almost all radio stations in New Zealand are part of a radio network, and most are network-owned.

Radio New Zealand (state-owned, non-commercial)
Radio New Zealand Concert
Radio New Zealand National
MediaWorks Radio (commercial network)
George FM
Mai FM
More FM (local programming in most markets between 6am and 1pm)
Radio Live
The Breeze (local in Wellington and Christchurch)
The Edge FM
The Rock
The Sound
Magic
New Zealand Media and Entertainment (formerly The Radio Network; commercial network)
Coast
Flava
Newstalk ZB
Radio Hauraki
Radio Sport
The Hits (local breakfast in some markets, local 9am3pm in other markets)
ZM
Rhema Group
Life FM
New Zealand's Rhema
Southern Star

Pakistan
Radio Pakistan
Hum FM
City FM 89
FM 98
FM 103

Philippines
ABS-CBN Corporation
Advanced Media Broadcasting System
Aliw Broadcasting Corporation
Associated Broadcasting Company
Audiovisual Communicators, Inc.
Blockbuster Broadcasting System
Bombo Radyo Philippines
Brainstone Broadcasting Inc.
Catholic Media Network
Christian Era Broadcasting Service
Delta Broadcasting System, Inc.
Eagle Broadcasting Corporation
Far East Broadcasting Company
FBS Radio Network
GMA Network 
Intercontinental Broadcasting Corporation
Manila Broadcasting Company
Mareco Broadcasting Network
Nation Broadcasting Corporation
Palawan Broadcasting Corporation
Philippine Broadcasting Service
Progressive Broadcasting Corporation
Quest Broadcasting Inc.
Radio Mindanao Network
Radio Philippines Network
Rajah Broadcasting Network
Raven Broadcasting Corporation
Real Radio Network Inc.
Sonshine Media Network International
Southern Broadcasting Network
ZOE Broadcasting Network

Poland

Public:
Polskie Radio
Program 1 (Jedynka) - (news, current affairs, easy listening music, focused at listeners aged 40–64) - AM, FM, DAB+ and the internet
Program 2 (Dwójka) - (Classical music, drama, comedy, literature) - FM, DAB+ and the internet
Program 3 (Trójka) - (Rock, alternative, Middle of the Road, focused at listeners aged 25–49) - FM, DAB+ and the internet
Program 4 (Czwórka) - (Dance, R&B, Reggae, Rap, Soul, focused at listeners aged 15–29) - FM, DAB+ and the internet
Polskie Radio Dla Zagranicy - (external service in English, Ukrainian, Russian, Belarusian) - AM, FM, DAB+, satellite and the internet
Non-commercial:
Radio Maryja (catholic)
Commercial:
Bauer Media Group:
RMF FM - hot adult contemporary radio (Target Demographic 18-44) (nationwide)
Eurozet:
Radio Zet - hot adult contemporary radio (Target Demographic 21-49) (nationwide)
Antyradio - rock and metal music (3 local stations)
Time company:
Radio Eska - contemporary hit radio (Target Demographic 13-29) (40 local stations)
Eska Rock - mainly rock music (local station broadcasting in Warsaw)
VOX FM - mostly Disco Polo
Agora company:
TOK FM - rolling news, talk, current affairs
Rock Radio - rock music (Target Demographic 18-39) (7 local stations)
Other:
Radio Kolor - local station in Warsaw
Radio Alfa - local station in Kraków
and over 100 other local stations

Romania

Public:
Radio România Actualități
Radio România Muzical
Radio Antena Satelor
Radio România Cultural
Radio Romania International

United Kingdom
British Broadcasting Corporation
BBC Radio
BBC Radio 1
BBC Radio 1Xtra
BBC Radio 2
BBC Radio 3
BBC Radio 4
BBC Radio 4 Extra
BBC Radio 5 Live
BBC Radio 5 Live Sports Extra
BBC Radio 6 Music
BBC Asian Network
Bauer Radio
Capital FM Network
Heart Network
Smooth Radio Network
Greatest Hits Radio

United States

International
United Nations Radio

See also
List of radio stations
Broadcast network
Radio network

References

Radio networks
Radio-related lists